North Bastion Mountain is a  peak in British Columbia, Canada. 
It is part of the Tower of London Range of the Muskwa Ranges in the Canadian Rockies. 

South Bastion Mountain is named after the South Bastion of the Tower of London.
Other mountains in the area are also named after the Tower, including The White Tower, South Bastion Mountain and Tower Mountain, which overlooks the south end of Wokkpash Lake.  These names were given by the Royal Fusiliers (City of London Regiment) Canadian Rocky Mountains Expedition 1960, a small expedition with members from a regiment based in the Tower of London.

References

External sources

Two-thousanders of British Columbia
Canadian Rockies
Peace River Land District